Gary W. Hicks Jr is an American politician serving as a member of the Tennessee House of Representatives from the 9th district. He assumed office on January 12, 2016.

Early life and education 
Hicks was born in Rogersville, Tennessee. He earned a Bachelor of Science degree in computer science from East Tennessee State University and a Master of Business Administration from the University of Tennessee.

Career 
Hicks worked as a network administrator for Rural Health Services. He has also worked as a technology director. Hicks was elected to the Tennessee House of Representatives in November 2015 and assumed office on January 12, 2016. Hicks also serves as chair of the House Finance, Ways and Means Subcommittee.

References 

Living people
Republican Party members of the Tennessee House of Representatives
People from Rogersville, Tennessee
East Tennessee State University alumni
University of Tennessee alumni
Year of birth missing (living people)